Jonas Björkman and Jacco Eltingh defeated the defending champions Todd Woodbridge and Mark Woodforde in the final, 6–2, 5–7, 2–6, 6–4, 6–3 to win the men's doubles tennis title at the 1998 Australian Open.

Seeds
Champion seeds are indicated in bold text while text in italics indicates the round in which those seeds were eliminated.

Draw

Finals

Top half

Section 1

Section 2

Bottom half

Section 3

Section 4

External links
 1998 Australian Open – Men's draws and results at the International Tennis Federation

Men's Doubles
Australian Open (tennis) by year – Men's doubles